Charles Ludwig Wagner (1869 - February 25, 1956) was a concert impresario. He managed John McCormack and Mary Garden and introduced Walter Gieseking.

Biography
He was born in 1869. 

Wagner authored a 1940 autobiography detailing his experiences as a manager of speakers and performing artists, Seeing Stars, published by G P Putnam's Sons, New York. 

He died on February 25, 1956, at Roosevelt Hospital in Manhattan.

References

1869 births
1956 deaths
Impresarios